Ophthalmoglipa australis is a species of beetle in the genus Ophthalmoglipa of the family Mordellidae. It was described in 1952.

References

Beetles described in 1952
Mordellidae